Meloimorpha japonica, also known as , the bell cricket, and the bell-ring cricket, is a species of cricket widespread in Asia (from India, through Indochina to Japan). It is known particularly for its chiming song in Japan, where they are often kept as pets.

Description
M. japonica range from approximately 17 to 25 mm in length and have wide wings which are shaped like melon seeds.

In Japan, they are found in Hokkaido (though not natively), Honshu, Shikoku, and Kyushu.

Subspecies
The Orthoptera Species File lists two subspecies:
 M. japonica japonica (Haan, 1844)
 M. japonica yunnanensis (Yin, 1998) - from southern China and Vietnam.

In Japanese literature
M. japonica is an autumn kigo used in haiku.

Suzumushi is the title of chapter 38 of The Tale of Genji, authored by Murasaki Shikibu. For unknown reasons, it is the only chapter skipped in Arthur Waley's translation of the book.

In the 1962 novel The Old Capital by Yasunari Kawabata, they are kept as pets by the main character, Chieko Sada, and are mentioned several times.

References

External links
 
 

Crickets
Taxa named by Wilhem de Haan
Orthoptera of Asia